The Geography of Franz Josef Land refers to an island group belonging to Arkhangelsk Oblast of Russia. It is situated in the Barents Sea of the Arctic, north of Novaya Zemlya and east of Svalbard. At latitudes between 80.0° and 81.9° north, it is the most northerly group of islands associated with Eurasia. The extreme northernmost point is Cape Fligely on Rudolf Island. It is currently uninhabited. The archipelago is only  from the North Pole, and the northernmost islands are closer to the Pole than any other land except for Canada's Ellesmere Island and Greenland. The largest island is Zemlya Georga (George Land) which measures  from end to end. The central cluster of large islands in the midst of the archipelago forms a compact whole, known as Zichy Land, where islands are separated from each other by very narrow sounds that are frozen most of the year.

During the period 1926 and 1932 Franz Josef Land also known in Russian as Zemlya Franca Josepha became a part of the Soviet Union and is included under the Arkhangelsk Oblast. In 1994, it was declared the Sakasnik Nature Reserve covering an area of  including area of the sea surrounding the land but with restricted entry only on special permit which is not given easily; out of this area,  area around the military base of Nagurskoye on the Alexandra Land is totally out of bounds.

Landforms

The group's 191 islands measure . As a result the reindeer population has not survived in these islands. Moving down to the coastal region, where the ice disappears, many lakes and ponds are seen. But as this area is very limited only small streams are noted, the largest extendigng only  in length on Prince George Island.

Islands

Its two largest islands are Prince George Island and Wilczek Land, the former lies to the west and the latter to the east in the archipelago. Two geographic subgroups in Franz Joseph Land are Zemlya Zichy (Zichy Land), a large and compact glaciarized island cluster located in the middle of the archipelago containing ten large islands, and Belaya Zemlya, a group of three islands in the northeast named Hvidtenland ("White Land") by Fridtjof Nansen. Through the middle of these two groups runs the wide strait which von Payer named the Austrian Strait, in honour of his country. Rudolph Island is the nearest to the North Pole. The largest island, Zemlya Georga (George Land) measures  from end to end.

The archipelago is divided in at least three subgroups:
 Western islands, west of the British Channel and De Bruyne Sound;
 Eastern islands, east of the Northeastern Sound, Beryozkina Channel and Austrian Strait;
 Central islands, everything in between these two.

The central islands again split in the minor groups:
 Northern islands, north of the Markham Sound;
 Southern islands, south of the Markham Sound.

Largest islands

Western islands 

The western islands are separated from the other islands by the British Channel and De Bruyne Sound to the east. They include the large Alexandra Land and Prince George Land and the smaller Arthur, Bruce, Mabel, Bell, and Northbrook islands.

Alexandra Land
Alexandra Land is the westernmost island in the archipelago. The sounds Cambridge Sound to the east and Arkhangelsky Sound off the northeast coast separate it from Zemlya Georga (also known as Prince George Land) to the east. Cape Nimrod lies on its western coast, and Cape George Thomas on its northeastern coast on Arkhangelsky Sound. There is a base named Nagurskoye near its northern coast, named after Jan Nagórski, which served as one of the most important meteorological stations in the archipelago during the Cold War. The northernmost Russian Air Force base is in the Alexandra Island (though in a poor condition)  with a small unit of security force is existing since 1955. Prior to this, the manned base station in the extreme north was in the Rudolph island which is defunct since 1955. It has a  snow runway. An Antonov An-72 cargo aircraft crashed while landing at Nagurskoye on 23 December 1996.

Prince George Land
Prince George Land (Zemlya Georga), lies to the east of Alexandra Island is the largest island of Franz Josef Land which measures  from end to end. Jackson named the island "Prince George Land" after Queen Victoria's grandson. To the southeast of this is Nightingale Sound, which separates the island from the small islands of Bell island, Mabel Island and Bruce Island. To the north of this and off the east coast of Zemlya Georga is the British Channel, which has Hooker Island to the far southeast. Zemlya Georga has several capes on its northern end, including Cape Murray on the northeastern peninsula, Cape Bruce on the north-northeastern peninsula, and Cape Battenberg on the northern peninsula, marking the northernmost point of the island. Several streams during the summer season flow into the sea in the northwestern side, and Geographer Bay divides the northeastern and north-north eastern peninsulas.

Northern islands

The northern and central islands lie to the north of the De Bruyne Sound and Markham Sound and to the west of the Austrian Strait. They includes Rudolf island to the north, the Zichy Land cluster of islands, and Heiss and Komsomol islands to the southeast.

Rudolf Island

Cape Fligely on Rudolf Island at 81°52' N is the northernmost point of Franz Josef Land. Lieutenant Julius von Payer, an officer of the Austro-Hungarian army, cartographer, and mountaineer, planted an Austro-Hungarian flag at Cape Fligely during the 1874 expedition that discovered Franz Josef Land. The Baldwin-Ziegler expedition arrived in 1902 and established a depot, and the Fiala-Ziegler expedition set up camp here for two seasons. A meteorological station was set up in 1932 in coordination with International Polar Year (1932–3) but was evacuated in 1941. A later station functioned until 1995. Several pre-World War II Soviet stations existed in Teplitz Bay but little has remained according to the observations of the Kapitan Dranitsyn expedition in 2004.

Zichy Land

The islands of the Zemlya Zichy archipelago are separated from each other by very narrow sounds that are frozen most of the year, forming a compact whole. From north to south the main islands are Karl-Alexander Island, Rainer Island, Jackson Island, Payer Island, Greely Island, Ziegler Island, Salisbury Island, Wiener Neustadt Island, Luigi Island and Champ Island.

Heiss and Komsomol

Heiss Island and Komsomol Island lie southeast of Zichy land. The Austria Strait separates Hall Island from Komsomol and the large Wilczek Island further to the northeast.
The abandoned Kheysa, Soviet rocket launching site, was located on this island. In the Geophysical Year 1957–58, a new meteorological station, which over the years became the largest such station, was established on the banks of a small crater lake in the ice free zone of this island and named after Ernst Krenkel, an Arctic explorer. The station was closed in 2000 and abandoned buildings are still seen here. Another weather station was established in 2005. The island is named after the Arctic explorer, Isaac Israel Hayes.

Southern islands

The southern islands lies east of De Bruyne Sound, and south of British Channel, Markham Sound and Austrian Strait. They include the larger Hooker, McClintock, Hall and Salm islands, and many smaller islands.

Hooker Island
Hooker Island, named after British naturalist Sir Joseph Dalton Hooker, lies to the southeast of Zemlya Georga, across the British Channel. A graveyard and two modern buildings exist. On Hooker Island's western side there is a bay in an un-glaciated area, Tikhaya Bay ). A large seabird colony exists near Tikhaya Bay at Skala Rubini ), a spectacular rock formation on Hooker Island's shore. Tikhaya Bay was the site of a major base for polar expeditions, and the location of a meteorological station from 1929 to 1963. There is another bay in the south of the island called Zaliv Makarova and another in the east known as Ledn. To the southwest, De Bruyne Sound separates the island from Northbrook Island. To the north, the Young Sound separates the island from the islands of Koetlitz, Nansen, Pritchett, and several others.

There are a number of islands surrounding Hooker Island. This island, which appears as Ostrov Itol in many Russian maps, was named after British scientist Rev. Alfred Edwin Eaton (1844–1929). This island is named after British yachtsman and explorer Benjamin Leigh Smith. West of Leigh-Smith Island's northern end, off Hooker island's northeastern shore, there is a smaller island known as Royal Society Island, named after the Royal Geographical Society.

MacKlintok Island
MacKlintok Island or McClintock Island, named after Irish explorer of the Arctic Francis Leopold McClintock, lies to the east of Brady Island, which lies to the east of Leigh-Smith Island and Hooker Island. This island, located within latitude 80.20° N and longitude 54.80° E, is roughly square-shaped. The island is located very close to the west of Hall Island, separated from it by a narrow sound, Proliv Negri. The island's northernmost point is Mys Grili (Greely Cape) and the southeastern is Mys Oppoltsera (Cape Oppholtzer).

Alger Island and the smaller Mathilda Island lies off MacKlintok Island's northern shore, separated from Alger by a  narrow sound. Brady Island off the west coast is a relatively large island and is mostly glaciated. Mys Vize, Brady Island's northernmost cape, is named after Russian Arctic expert Vladimir Wiese.

Alger Island
Alger Island,, is a small island at latitude 80° 23′ N and longitude 56.00° E. It divides the south-central islands and the north-central group, and is located to the south of  Markham Strait. McClintock Island lies to its south. Discovered in August 1899 by the Walter Welmann expedition, it was named after Russell A. Alger, US Secretary of War. The coastline is fairly ice free. In 1901, Evelyn Briggs Baldwin established a camp here and named it Camp Ziegler, after  William Ziegler, who had sponsored the expedition.

Hall Island

Hall Island (Ostrov Gallya) is an almost completely glacierized large island of  immediately to the east of MacKlintok Island. It was named after American Arctic explorer Charles Francis Hall. The only relatively large areas free of permanent ice are located in its southern end, where there are two headlands, Cape Tegetthoff, and Cape Ozernyy, on the Littov Peninsula. Cape Tegetthoff has a range of hill peaks. There is also a very small unglacierized area around its eastern cape, Cape Frankfurt, and another in its northwestern point, Cape Wiggins. There is a wide bay on the southeastern side of Hall Island known as Hydrographer Bay and a smaller one west of the Littov Peninsula, known as Bukhta Surovaya. To the southeast, there is a wider strait separating Hall Island from Salm Island, known as Proliv Lavroka. The strait to the east is known as Avstriskiy Proliv.

Unglacierized, this island was named after cartographer Heinrich Berghaus (1797–1884).

Eastern islands

The easterns islands lie to the east of the Austrian Strait, and include Wilczek Island, La Ronciere Island, and Graham Bell Island.

Eva-Liv Island
The island was discovered by Nansen and Johansen on 24 July 1895. Nansen thought there were two islands, and named them after his wife and daughter. In 1905 it was found that "Eva" and "Liv" were in fact one island.

Graham Bell Island
Partially glaciated, its highest point is  near the southern centre. Cape Kohlsaat, the easternmost point of the archipelago at 81°14′N, 65°10′E, lies on Graham Bell Island's eastern shore. Cape Kohlsaat marks the northwesternmost corner of the Kara Sea, therefore it is a significant geographical landmark. Cape Leiter lies on the south point of the island. This island was named after inventor Alexander Graham Bell. Graham Bell Island should not be confused with the smaller Bell Island which is also part of the Franz Josef archipelago. Graham Bell Island is home to a Cold War outpost (shut down in 1994) and the airfield 'Greem Bell' with a  runway. This small island is mostly ice free and has a lagoon in the backdrop of a bell shaped mountain. The log cabin built by Benjamin Leigh Smith in 1881 is a well preserved cabin even now and is the oldest house on the land though unoccupied.

Graham Bell Island's northern shore is fringed by clusters of very small islets. Three-ray Island lies off the western coast.

Wilczek Land
Wilczek Land is barren and its basaltic rock cliffs are exposed. It lies to the northeast of Hall Island, across the Austrian Strait. It is the second largest island of the Franz Josef Archipelago and is almost completely glaciarized except for two narrow areas along its western shores. This large island is named after Austro-Hungarian Count Johann Nepomuk Wilczek, involved in the Austro-Hungarian North Pole Expedition. This island should not be confused with small Wilczek Island, located southwest of Salm Island and named after the same person. Mys Ganza is Wilczek Land's westernmost cape. Cape Geller was the wintering site for two members of the 1899 Wellman expedition. Left with minimal supplies, one of them did not survive.

McNult Island lies just off the southeastern cape, with several other islets. Just off the eastern coast of Wilczek Land lie two small islets called Ostrova Gorbunova, named after Russian naturalist Gregory Petrovich Gorbunov. The northern side of Wilczek is separated from La Ronciere Island by a straight known as Vanderbilt. The small island of Geddes lies off the northwestern point. To the east, Wilczek Land is separated from Graham Bell Sound by the Morgan Straight.

List of Islands
Islands of Franz Josef Land include:

Waterways
Markham Sound is a waterway between Zichy Land and the islands of McClintock and Hall. West of the British Channel is Prince George Land. Alexandra Land contains Weyprecht Bay. West of Austria Sound is Zichy Land. Immediately north of Franz Josef Land is the Queen Victoria Sea.

Climate
Climatic conditions here are very severe with minimum temperatures as low as (-)25 °C to (-) 30 °C during winter; even in summers the temperature does not rise above . The polar nights lasts for 125 days while the polar days are 140. Climatically, the Gulf Streams does not reach the islands of Franz Josef Land. Polynias are formed by the wind and sea currents that prevail in the northern and southern part of the land mass, which are the causative factors for the large ice free zone in the sea. The eastern and northern winds cause very cold breezes.

Geology
Fossilized tree trunks here attest to this assessment. Above the Jurassic sedimentary layer of  thickness, which is basaltic, cretaceous period intrusions of dolerite caused by volcanic eruptions are recorded. Also seen are many fault zones which have contributed to the removal of volcanic layers and exposing plateau tops and rock walls. Though most of the land is covered by glacial ice, it does have outcrops covered with moss. The northeastern part of the archipelago is locked in pack ice most of the year; however the ice sometimes retreats north past the islands in summer (September).

References

Bibliography

Links
 Franz Josef Land map, imagico.de

Further reading
 

Franz Josef Land
Geography of Arkhangelsk Oblast
Geography of the Arctic